The H. E. Muchnic House is a historic house in Atchison, Kansas. It was built in 1887-1888 for George W. Howell, a lumber dealer. It was purchased by Harry E. Muchnic, the founder of Locomotive Finished Material Company, in 1922. The company later merged with Rockwell International.

The house was designed in the Victorian architectural style. It has been listed on the National Register of Historic Places since July 12, 1974.

References

Houses on the National Register of Historic Places in Kansas
National Register of Historic Places in Atchison County, Kansas
Victorian architecture in Kansas
Houses completed in 1887